Leigh Davies is a former international Wales rugby union player. A centre, he was known for his strength and direct running. He played rugby for various clubs including stints at Neath RFC, Cardiff RFC, Bristol RFC, Llanelli RFC. In 2003 he was the first captain of the Llanelli Scarlets region. He left the Scarlets during the 2004–05 season to travel the world. In 2005 he was signed by the Scarlets' rivals the Ospreys who were in their first season at the Liberty Stadium. Davies released the following Season.

References

Living people
1976 births
Welsh rugby union players
Wales international rugby union players
Cardiff RFC players
Neath RFC players
Llanelli RFC players
Rugby union players from Neath
Scarlets players
Ospreys (rugby union) players
Rugby union centres